USNS Soderman may refer to:

  is a cargo ship acquired by the US Navy in 1997 and renamed Soderman (T-AKR-299). She was again renamed GYSGT Fred W. Stockham (T-AK-3017) in 2001 and is currently in service.

United States Navy ship names